The 1996 Bowling Green Falcons football team was an American football team that represented Bowling Green University in the Mid-American Conference (MAC) during the 1996 NCAA Division I-A football season. In their sixth season under head coach Gary Blackney, the Falcons compiled a 4–7 record (3–5 against MAC opponents), finished in sixth place in the MAC, and were outscored by all opponents by a combined total of 240 to 176.

The team's statistical leaders included Bob Niemet with 1,129 passing yards, Courtney Davis with 767 rushing yards, and Damron Hamilton with 465 receiving yards.

Schedule

Roster

References

Bowling Green
Bowling Green Falcons football seasons
Bowling Green Falcons football